Anaëlle Roulet (born 19 February 1996) is a French Paralympic swimmer who competes in international level events, she swims backstroke and freestyle swimming.

Career
She is a two-time World silver medalist and a two-time European bronze medalist, she has also competed at the Paralympic Games twice but did not medal.

Personal life
Roulet was born with an underdeveloped lower right leg and has scoliosis.

References

External links 
 
 

1996 births
Living people
People from La Roche-sur-Yon
Sportspeople from Rennes
Paralympic swimmers of France
Swimmers at the 2012 Summer Paralympics
Swimmers at the 2016 Summer Paralympics
Medalists at the World Para Swimming Championships
Medalists at the World Para Swimming European Championships
French female backstroke swimmers
S10-classified Paralympic swimmers
Sportspeople from Vendée
21st-century French women